Tor Baseball Field (a.k.a. Tors-Whitecaps Field, Whitecaps-Tors Field, Whitecaps Field, GISD/Whitecaps Field) is the home of the Galveston Ball Tornadoes located at 83rd and Stewart Roads on Galveston Island. The field has also been the home of the Galveston College Whitecaps baseball team from 1992 to 2009. However, the Galveston Independent School District took over the field after the 2009 season causing Galveston College to look for a new home. The field was also ravaged by Hurricane Ike in September 2008.

References

Baseball venues in Texas
Sports in Galveston, Texas
Buildings and structures in Galveston, Texas
Defunct college baseball venues in the United States
High school baseball venues in the United States